Paradise Park or formerly known as Seri Center is a shopping mall located in Prawet, Bangkok, Thailand. The retail giants Siam Piwat and MBK made a new joint-venture for new opportunities in the suburbs of Bangkok their Paradise Park Srinagarindra transformed Seri Center at a total cost of Bt3.2 billion. The mall opened officially on August 24, 2010 . It has been a rival to a nearby mall, Seacon Square. Of the visitors to Paradise Park, about 70 per cent are people who live within a 3-kilometre radius, while the rest come from other areas of Bangkok as well as upcountry. The two companies bought the shares of Seri Centre Management for more than Bt975 million and transformed it into a new mega-mall that is expected to attract about 100,000 visitors a day.

Facilities

Anchors
Paradise Park's major retail anchors include:
 Villa Market
 Seri Market
 Loft
 SportsWorld
 HomePro
 Paradise Cineplex 8 Cinemas

Former Anchors
Printemps Opened in 1994 Closed down in 199x
Daimaru Opened in 1994 Closed down in 2000
@ease Department Store Opened in 2000 Closed down in 2009
Tokyu Department Store Closed down in January 2019

Mall Zones
 Dining Paradise
 Food Bazaar (doner kebab)
 Beauty Park
 Digital World
 Money Park
 World of Edutainment
 Fashion Avenue
 Living & Lifestyle
 The Promenade

Restaurants
 Food courts are located on the ground floor and on the first floor of the shopping mall. There are two food courts on the ground floor at opposite ends of the mall, near the markets. There are also Japanese restaurants, fast food and an MK steamboat restaurant.
 At food bazar you can find doner kebab (Turkish) too.
Cafe Olivie: Italian Cuisine

Leisure activities
 Paradise Cineplex – A branch of Thailand's largest movie-theater chain " Major Cineplex" plays first-run films. In the concept of Cinematic Haven.

Parking
Seri Center has an eight-level carpark with a capacity of 4,000 cars. There is no fee for parking in the secured building.

Nearby attractions
Rama IX Park
Seacon Square
CentralPlaza Bangna

See also
List of shopping malls in Thailand

References

External links
 Official website

Shopping malls in Bangkok
Prawet district
Shopping malls established in 2010
2010 establishments in Thailand